Derek McCleane (born 4 January 1938) is an Irish middle-distance runner. He competed in the men's 800 metres at the 1964 Summer Olympics.

References

1938 births
Living people
Athletes (track and field) at the 1964 Summer Olympics
Irish male middle-distance runners
Olympic athletes of Ireland
Place of birth missing (living people)